A Sailor Tramp is a 1922 British silent adventure film directed by Floyd Martin Thornton and starring Victor McLaglen, Pauline Johnson and Hugh E. Wright. It was based on a 1902 novel by Bart Kennedy.

Cast
 Victor McLaglen as The Sailor Tramp 
 Pauline Johnson as The Girl 
 Hugh E. Wright as The Cockney 
 Ambrose Manning as The Father 
 Harry Worth as The Foreman 
 Bertie Wright as The Proprietor 
 Kate Gurney as The Mother 
 Mrs. Hubert Willis as Aunt

References

Bibliography
 Low, Rachael. History of the British Film, 1918-1929. George Allen & Unwin, 1971.

External links

Films directed by Floyd Martin Thornton
1922 films
1922 adventure films
British adventure films
British silent feature films
1920s English-language films
Films based on British novels
British black-and-white films
1920s British films
Silent adventure films